Mile Zečević was the eighth Director of the Administration for Security and Counterintelligence (UBK) of Macedonia.

Career
Zečević was appointed as the Director of UBK in 2004 by Prime Minister Hari Kostov.

See also
 Law enforcement in the Republic of Macedonia

References

Living people
Macedonian politicians
Year of birth missing (living people)